Coupe du Congo may refer to:

 Coupe du Congo (DR Congo), knockout cup football competition of the Democratic Republic of the Congo
 Coupe du Congo (Republic of Congo), knockout cup football competition of the Republic of the Congo